Edgar Raymond Kiess (August 26, 1875 – July 20, 1930) was a Republican member of the U.S. House of Representatives from Pennsylvania.

Biography
Kiess was born in Warrensville, Pennsylvania. He graduated from the Lycoming County Normal School in Muncy, Pennsylvania, in 1892. He taught in the public schools of Lycoming County for two years. He became engaged in the newspaper publishing business in Hughesville, Pennsylvania, in 1894. He served as a member of the Pennsylvania State House of Representatives from 1904 to 1910. He was engaged in business in Williamsport, Pennsylvania, in 1910, and served as a trustee of Pennsylvania State College from 1912 to 1930.

Kiess was elected as a Republican to the Sixty-third and to the eight succeeding Congresses and served until his death at his summer home at Eagles Mere, Pennsylvania in 1930. He served as chairman of the House Committee on Insular Affairs, which had jurisdiction over United States territories such as Puerto Rico and the Philippines, during the Sixty-ninth through Seventy-first Congresses. Interment was at Wildwood Cemetery in Williamsport.

See also
List of United States Congress members who died in office (1900–49)

Sources

External links
 

1875 births
1930 deaths
Republican Party members of the Pennsylvania House of Representatives
Politicians from Williamsport, Pennsylvania
Republican Party members of the United States House of Representatives from Pennsylvania